Midnite Lover is the fourth studio album released by Jamaican singer Shaggy. The self-produced album became the follow-up to Shaggy's career-making album Boombastic; however, it did not fare as well. The album features covers of Erma Franklin's "Piece of My Heart", and Bob Marley's "Thank You Lord", which features guest vocals from Ky-Mani Marley. 50,000 copies of the album were sold in the UK. "Piece of My Heart" and "My Dream" were the only two singles released from the album.

Track listing
 "My Dream" - 3:22
 "Perfect Song" (featuring Maxi Priest) - 3:43
 "Tender Love" - 3:49
 "Geenie" (featuring Brian and Tony Gold) - 4:00
 "Sexy Body Girls" - 3:49
 "Piece of My Heart" (featuring Marsha) - 4:17
 "Think Ah So It Go" - 3:30
 "Midnite Lover" - 3:44
 "Mission" - 3:49
 "Way Back Home" - 4:08
 "John Doe" - 3:40
 "Thank You Lord" (featuring Ky-Mani) - 3:51
 "Piece of My Heart" (Urban Remix) - 4:18

References

1997 albums
Shaggy (musician) albums
Virgin Records albums